The 2022 Redbridge London Borough Council election took place on 5 May 2022. All 63 members of Redbridge London Borough Council will be elected. The elections will take place alongside local elections in the other London boroughs and elections to local authorities across the United Kingdom.

In the previous election in 2018, the Labour Party maintained its control of the council, winning 51 out of the 63 seats with the Conservative Party forming the council opposition with the remaining twelve seats.

Background

History 

The thirty-two London boroughs were established in 1965 by the London Government Act 1963. They are the principal authorities in Greater London and have responsibilities including education, housing, planning, highways, social services, libraries, recreation, waste, environmental health and revenue collection. Some of the powers are shared with the Greater London Authority, which also manages passenger transport, police and fire.

Since its formation, Redbridge has generally been under Conservative control or no overall control. The Labour Party won its first majority on the council in the 2014 election, winning 35 seats while the Conservatives won 25 and the Liberal Democrats won three. In the most recent election in 2018, Labour extended its majority to win 51 seats with 58.4% of the vote across the borough while the Conservatives won the remaining 12 seats with 35.3% of the vote.

Council term 

In August 2020, Stuart Bellwood, a Labour councillor for Seven Kings, died. He had served as a councillor since 2002. A Labour councillor for Loxford ward, Chaudhary Mohammed Iqbal, resigned in October 2020 citing health reasons. He was later found guilty of electoral fraud for giving a false address. Due to the COVID-19 pandemic, by-elections for both seats were delayed until 6 May 2021 alongside the 2021 London mayoral election and London Assembly election. Labour held both seats, with Sadhia Warraich winning Loxford and Pushpita Gupta winning Seven Kings.

In April 2021, Robin Turbefield, a Conservative councillor for Bridge ward, defected to Reform UK due to his opposition to lockdown measures in response to COVID-19. In November 2021, Khaled Noor, a councillor for Barkingside, had the Labour whip removed due to his conduct.

Electoral process 
Redbridge, like other London borough councils, elects all of its councillors at once every four years. The previous election took place in 2018. The election will take place by multi-member first-past-the-post voting, with each ward being represented by two or three councillors. Electors will have as many votes as there are councillors to be elected in their ward, with the top two or three being elected.

All registered electors (British, Irish, Commonwealth and European Union citizens) living in London aged 18 or over will be entitled to vote in the election. People who live at two addresses in different councils, such as university students with different term-time and holiday addresses, are entitled to be registered for and vote in elections in both local authorities. Voting in-person at polling stations will take place from 7:00 to 22:00 on election day, and voters will be able to apply for postal votes or proxy votes in advance of the election.

Previous council composition

Results summary

Ward results 
Candidates shown below are confirmed candidates. An asterisk * indicates an incumbent Councillor seeking re-election.

Aldborough

Barkingside

Bridge

Chadwell

Churchfields

Clayhall

Clementswood

Cranbrook

Fairlop

Fullwell

Goodmayes

Hainault

Ilford Town

Loxford

Mayfield

Monkhams

Newbury

Seven Kings

South Woodford

Valentines

Wanstead Park

Wanstead Village

References 

Council elections in the London Borough of Redbridge
Redbridge